is a Japanese footballer who plays for Kamatamare Sanuki.

Club statistics
Updated to 9 August 2022.

References

External links
Profile at Giravanz Kitakyushu
Profile at Yokohama F. Marinos 

1989 births
Living people
Kanagawa University alumni
Association football people from Kanagawa Prefecture
Japanese footballers
J1 League players
J2 League players
J3 League players
YSCC Yokohama players
Yokohama F. Marinos players
Giravanz Kitakyushu players
Association football goalkeepers